
In basketball, a rebound is the act of gaining possession of the ball after an unsuccessful field goal or free throw. Players on this list have all recorded 30 or more rebounds in a single game. The NCAA did not split into its current divisions format until August 1973. From 1906 to 1955, there were no classifications to the NCAA nor its predecessor, the Intercollegiate Athletic Association of the United States (IAAUS). Then, from 1956 to 1973, colleges were classified as either "NCAA University Division (Major College)" or "NCAA College Division (Small College)". Additionally, the NCAA recognizes two different eras in college basketball history when it comes to the statistic of rebounding: the pre-1973 era and the post-1973 era. In the pre-1973 era (otherwise known as the era before the divisional setup), opponents may have been less talented and from smaller schools (such as the National Association of Intercollegiate Athletics [NAIA] or Divisions II and III in today's classification). Although the 1972–73 season was before the divisional split, the NCAA officially considers that season to be "post-1973" because of the adoption of freshman eligibility for varsity play in all NCAA sports effective in August 1972. Therefore, the all-time single game rebound record is 51, set by Bill Chambers of William & Mary in 1953. Chambers' 51-rebound effort contributed to a Virginia state record of 100 team rebounds by the Tribe against UVA. The post-1973 era record is 35, set by Fresno State's Larry Abney on February 17, 2000. Abney's modern-day record has never seen any real challenge to be broken; the closest another player has come were 30-rebound efforts by Rashad Jones-Jennings of Arkansas–Little Rock in 2005 and Kendall Gray of Delaware State in 2015.

Seven players on this list have been enshrined into the Naismith Memorial Basketball Hall of Fame: Elgin Baylor, Wilt Chamberlain, Dave DeBusschere, Artis Gilmore, Tom Heinsohn, Bailey Howell and Maurice Stokes. John Tresvant of Seattle, who recorded 40 rebounds on February 8, 1963, claims that he finished the game against Montana with more: "Actually, I had 44 (rebounds). I know I got more when I went back over the game. The guy keeping the stats told me later he didn't mark them all down."

If true, this would have placed Tresvant second all-time for rebounds in a game, but still well behind Chambers' mark. Among players on the list, only one freshman has officially recorded 30 or more rebounds. Durand "Rudy" Macklin of LSU set the school record as a freshman on November 26, 1976, when he grabbed 32 rebounds against Tulane. Robert Parish of Centenary, also a Hall of Famer, had one performance that would have made him the first freshman to record 30 or more rebounds; he collected 33 against Southern Mississippi on January 27, 1973. However, due to sanctions related to Parish's recruitment, the NCAA omitted all Centenary games and statistics from its official records starting with his freshman year of 1972–73 and continuing through the 1977–78 season, two years after Parish's graduation.

Key

Dates of 30+ rebounds

Pre-1973 era
Note: Since there were so many occurrences of individual players grabbing 30+ rebounds during the pre-1973 college basketball era, the official NCAA men's basketball media guide cut the list off at some of the instances of 34 rebounds and more. This list, therefore, is not comprehensive, but the post-1973 era list is.

Post-1973 era

See also
List of National Basketball Association players with most rebounds in a game

References
General

Specific

NCAA Division I men's basketball statistical leaders